European Universities Tennis Championships were the first organised in 2004 and have been organised annually since. They are coordinated by the European University Sports Association along with the 18 other sports on the program of the European universities championships.

Overview

References

External links 
 EUSA official website

Tennis tournaments
tennis